The railroad brotherhoods are labor unions of railroad workers in the United States. They first appeared in 1863 and they are still active.  Until recent years they were largely independent of each other and of the American Federation of Labor.

1863–1920
With the rapid growth and consolidation of large railroad systems after 1870, union organizations sprang up, covering the entire nation. By 1901, 17 major railway brotherhood were in operation; they generally worked amicably with management, which recognize their usefulness. Key unions included the Brotherhood of Locomotive Engineers (BLE), the Order of Railway Conductors, the Brotherhood of Locomotive Firemen, and the Brotherhood of Railroad Trainmen. Their main goal was building insurance and medical packages for their members, and negotiating bureaucratic work rules that favored their membership, such as seniority and grievance procedures. They were not members of the AFL, and fought off more radical rivals such as  the Knights of Labor in the 1880s  and the American Railroad Union in the 1890s. They consolidated their power in 1916, after threatening a national strike,  by securing the Adamson Act, a federal law that provided 10 hours' pay for an eight-hour day.

1920s
At the end World War I, the brotherhoods promoted the "Plumb Plan" for the nationalization of the railroads, and conducted a national strike in 1919.  Both efforts failed, and the brotherhoods were largely stagnant in the 1920s.  They generally were independent politically, but supported the third-party campaign of Robert M. La Follette in 1924.

The Republican Party was dominant in Washington and it was generally hostile to the brotherhoods until it moderated its position around 1926.

The Great Railroad Strike of 1922, a nationwide railroad shop workers' strike, began on July 1. The immediate cause of the strike was the Railroad Labor Board's announcement that hourly wages would be cut by seven cents on July 1, which prompted a shop workers' vote on whether or not to strike. The operators' union did not join in the strike, and the railroads employed strikebreakers to fill three-fourths of the roughly 400,000 vacated positions, increasing hostilities between the railroads and the striking workers. On September 1, a federal judge issued a sweeping injunction against striking, assembling, picketing, colloquially known as the "Daugherty injunction".

Unions bitterly resented the injunction; a few sympathy strikes shut down some railroads completely. The strike eventually died out as many shopmen made deals with the railroads on the local level. The often unpalatable concessions—coupled with memories of the violence and tension during the strike—soured relations between the railroads and the shopmen for years.

Main railroad brotherhoods

See also
 Brotherhood of Railway Clerks
 Labor history of the United States#Railroad brotherhoods

References

Further reading
 Arnesen, Eric. "'Like Banquo's Ghost, It Will Not Down': The Race Question and the American Railroad Brotherhoods, 1880-1920." American Historical Review 99.5 (1994): 1601–1633. online
 Arnesen, Eric. Brotherhoods of Color: Black Railroad Workers and the Struggle for Equality (2001)
 Bernstein, David E. "Racism, Railroad Unions, and Labor Regulations." The Independent Review 5.2 (2000): 237–247. online
 Chateauvert, Melinda. Marching together: Women of the brotherhood of sleeping car porters (University of Illinois Press, 1997), on the auxiliaries.
 Cupper, Dan. "Review of 'History of the BLET: Since 1863'" Railroad History (2013) #209 pp. 115–116 online
 Gamst, Frederick C. "Railroad Craft Seniority: The Essence of Railroad Society and Culture (and Its 'State')." Kroeber Anthropological Society Papers (2003): 176-204 online.
 Kelly, Joseph. "Showing Agency on the Margins: African American Railway Workers in the South and Their Unions, 1917–1930." Labour: Journal of Canadian Labour Studies/Le Travail: revue d’Études Ouvrières Canadiennes 71 (2013): 123–148, in the USA. online
  McIntyre, Stephen L., "'The City Belongs to the Local Unions': The Rise of the Springfield Labor Movement, 1871-1912," Missouri Historical Review 98 (2003): 24–46. in Springfield, Missouri
 Olssen, Erik. "The making of a political machine: The railroad unions enter politics." Labor History 19.3 (1978): 373–396, in 1922 in the Conference for Progressive Political Action (CPPA). 
 Osborn, Christabel. "Railway Brotherhoods in the United States." The Economic Journal 8.32 (1898): 577-579 online.
 Stradling, David. "Dirty Work and Clean Air: Locomotive Firemen, Environmental Activists, and Stories of Conflict." Journal of Urban History 28.1 (2001): 35–54.
 Stromquist, Shelton. "Enginemen and Shopmen: Technological change and the organization of labor in an ERA of railroad expansion." Labor History 24.4 (1983): 485–499.
 Taillon, Paul Michel. " 'What we want is good, sober men:' masculinity, respectability, and temperance in the railroad brotherhoods, C. 1870-1910." Journal of Social History 36.2 (2002): 319–338. excerpt
 Taillon, Paul Michel. Good, Reliable, White Men: Railroad Brotherhoods, 1877-1917 (U of Illinois Press, 2009).
 Taillon, Paul Michel. "Americanism, Racism, and 'Progressive' Unionism: The Railroad Brotherhoods, 1898-1916." Australasian Journal of American Studies 20.1 (2001): 55–65. online
 Troy, Leo. "Labor representation on American railways." Labor History 2.3 (1961): 295–322.
 Walker, Mark. "Aristocracies of labor: craft unionism, immigration, and working-class households in West Oakland, California." Historical Archaeology 42.1 (2008): 108–132, on standard of living. online
 Wetzel, Kurt. "Railroad management's response to operating employees accidents, 1890–1913." Labor History 21.3 (1980): 351–368.
 White, W. Thomas. "Railroad Labor Protests, 1894-1917: From Community to Class in the Pacific Northwest." Pacific Northwest Quarterly 75.1 (1984): 13–21. online.
 Williams-Searle, John. "Courting Risk: Disability, Masculinity, and Liability on Iowa’s Railroads, 1868–1900." The Annals of Iowa 58.1 (1999): 27–77.
 Zieger, Robert H. "From hostility to moderation: Railroad labor policy in the 1920s." Labor History 9.1 (1968): 23–38.

External links

 Bibliography of online resources on railway labor in late 19th century 
 

Labor history
Railway unions in the United States